Carl Wilhelm Wagner (May 25, 1901 – December 10, 1977) was a German Physical chemist. He is best known for his pioneering work on Solid-state chemistry, where his work on oxidation rate theory, counter diffusion of ions and defect chemistry led to a better understanding of how reactions take place at the atomic level. His life and achievements were honoured in a Solid State Ionics symposium commemorating his 100th birthday in 2001, where he was described as the Father of Solid State Chemistry.

Early life
Wagner was born in Leipzig, Germany; the son of Dr Julius Wagner who was the Head of Chemistry at the local institute and secretary of the German Bunsen Society of Physical Chemistry. Wagner graduated at the University of Munich and gained his PhD at the University of Leipzig in 1924 supervised by Max Le Blanc with a dissertation on the reaction rate in solutions. "Beiträge zur Kenntnis der Reaktionsgeschwindigkeit in Lösungen"

Career
Wagner was interested in the measurement of thermodynamic activities of the components in solid and liquid alloys. He also carried out research on problems of solid state chemistry, especially the role of defects of ionic crystals on thermodynamic properties, electrical conductivity and diffusion.

He became a research fellow at the Bodernstein Institute at the University of Berlin. It was in Berlin that he first became acquainted with Walter H. Schottky who asked him to co-author a book on thermodynamic problems. Together with Hermann Ulich they published "Thermodynamik" in 1929, which is still considered a standard reference in the field.

In 1930 he was Privatdozent at the University of Jena and published a notable paper with Schottky  “Theorie der geordneten Mischphasen” (Theory of arranged mixed phases). His subsequent published papers led to the new concept of chemical disorder now known as Defect Chemistry. Wagner spent one year as Visiting Professor of Physical Chemistry, at the University of Hamburg in 1933,  before moving to the Technische Universität Darmstadt where he was Professor of Physical Chemistry until 1945. He proposed an important law of oxidation kinetics in 1933.
In 1936 he published a crucial paper “On the mechanism of the formation of ionic crystals of higher order (double salts, spinels, silicates)”  a concept of counter-diffusion of cations, which contributed to the understanding of all diffusion controlled, solid state reactions. Over a twenty-year period he produced an important body of work relating to the bulk transport processes in oxides.

Wagner and Schottky proposed the point defect-mediated mechanism of mass transport in solids, Wagner then extended the analysis to electronic defects.
For these works and for his subsequent research on local equilibrium, his oxidation rate theory, and the concept of counter diffusion of cations, Wagner is considered by some as the "father of solid state chemistry."

At the end of the Second World War, it was anticipated that German universities and research establishments would undergo a long period of re-building and Wagner was invited to the USA to become a scientific advisor at Fort Bliss, Texas with other German scientists as part of Operation Paperclip. He acquired US citizenship at this time. His work on the thermodynamics of fuels used in V2-rockets was continued by Malcolm Hebb and their techniques are now known as the Hebb-Wagner polarisation method. Wagner was a professor of metallurgy at MIT from 1949 until 1958. He then returned to Germany to take up the position of Director of the Max Planck Institute of Physical Chemistry at Göttingen, which was vacant to due to the untimely death of Karl Friedrich Bonhoeffer In 1961 he produced a paper on the theory of the ageing of precipitates by dissolution-reprecipitation Ostwald ripening now known as the  Lifshitz-Slyozov-Wagner - theory, which helps predict the rate of coarsening in alloys. When NASA tested the theory in space shuttle experiments they discovered the theory didn't work as they at first expected and realised the way engineers had been using it needed to be reconsidered.

Legacy
Wagner officially retired in 1966 but from 1967 to 1977 was a Scientific Member of the Max Planck Institute in Göttingen, continuing to contribute to publications. Many modern inventions based on solid state technology and Semiconductor fabrication, used in devices such as solar energy conversion have been developed with the aid of Wagner's theories. Some examples of solid state electrochemical devices are typically, fuel cells, batteries, sensors and membranes.

Wagner died on 10 December 1977 in Göttingen.

Honours
 1951 - Palladium Medal of the Electrochemical Society
 1957 - Willis R. Whitney Award, NACE
 1959 - Wilhelm Exner Medal of the 
 1961 - Bunsen Medal of the German Bunsen Society
 1964 -  of the 
 1972 - Honorary member of the German Bunsen Society
 1972 - Heyn Medal of the German Society of Metallurgy
 1973 - Cavallaro Medal, European Federation of Corrosion
 Honorary member of American Institute of Mining, Metallurgical and Petroleum Engineers
 1973 - Honorary member of the Mathematics and Natural Sciences of the Austrian Academy of Sciences in Vienna
 1973 - Gold Medal of the American Society for Metals
 1975 - Honorary Membership of the Japan Institute of Metals
 1975 - Corresponding member of the

See also
Electrochemical engineering
Diffusion
Solid-state ionics
Lifshitz–Slyozov–Wagner theory

References

External links 
 Chemistry Tree: Carl W. Wagner Details

1901 births
1977 deaths
Scientists from Leipzig
German physical chemists
MIT School of Engineering faculty
Foreign associates of the National Academy of Sciences
Academic staff of Technische Universität Darmstadt
Fellows of the Minerals, Metals & Materials Society
Solid state chemists
Ludwig Maximilian University of Munich alumni
Academic staff of the University of Jena
20th-century German chemists
Academic staff of Max Planck Society
Leipzig University alumni
Max Planck Institute directors